Anna Grineva (born 31 January 1988) is a water polo player from Russia. She was part of the Russian team at the 2016 Summer Olympics, where the team won the bronze medal.

See also
 List of Olympic medalists in water polo (women)

References

External links
 

Russian female water polo players
Living people
1988 births
Olympic water polo players of Russia
Water polo players at the 2016 Summer Olympics
Olympic bronze medalists for Russia
Medalists at the 2016 Summer Olympics
Olympic medalists in water polo
Universiade bronze medalists for Russia
Universiade medalists in water polo
Medalists at the 2009 Summer Universiade
Medalists at the 2013 Summer Universiade
21st-century Russian women